Moses Soyer (December 25, 1899 – September 3, 1974) was an American social realist painter.

Biography
He was born as Moses Schoar and both he and his identical twin brother, Raphael, were born in Borisoglebsk, Tambov, a southern province of Russia on December 25, 1899. Their father, Abraham Shauer, a Hebrew scholar, writer and teacher, raised his six children in an intellectual environment in which much emphasis was placed on academic and artistic pursuits. Their mother, Bella, was an embroiderer. Their cousin was painter and meteorologist Joshua Zalman Holland. Due to the many difficulties for the Jewish population in the late Russian Empire, the Soyer family was forced to emigrate in 1912 to the United States, where they ultimately settled in the Bronx. The family name changed from Schoar to Soyer during immigration.

Soyer married in 1922 to Ida Chassne, a dancer. Together they had one son, David Soyer. Dancers were a recurring subject in his paintings.

Soyer studied art in New York with his twin Raphael, first at Cooper Union, and continued his studied at National Academy of Design. He diverged from his twin and attended Educational Alliance. And later studying at the Ferrer Art School, where he studied under the Ashcan painters Robert Henri and George Bellows.

He had his first solo exhibition in 1926 and began teaching art the following year at the Contemporary Art School and The New School.

He was an artist of the Great Depression, and during the 1930s, Moses and his brother Raphael engaged in Social Realism, demonstrating empathy with the struggles of the working class. In 1939, the twins worked together with the Works Project Administration, Federal Art Project (WPA-FAP) mural at the Kingsessing Station post office in Philadelphia.

Soyer wrote a weekly column for a Yiddish newspaper called "In the World of Art".

Death and legacy
He died in the Chelsea Hotel in New York  on September 3, 1974, while painting dancer and choreographer Phoebe Neville. He was buried in Acacia Cemetery in Queens County, New York.

The Brooklyn Museum, the Detroit Institute of Arts, the Hirshhorn Museum and Sculpture Garden (Washington, DC), the Honolulu Museum of Art, the Metropolitan Museum of Art, the Museum of Modern Art (New York City), the Philadelphia Museum of Art, The Phillips Collection (Washington, DC), the Walker Art Center (Minneapolis, Minnesota), the Whitney Museum of American Art (New York City), the Amon Carter Museum of American Art (Fort Worth), the Smithsonian American Art Museum, and Yale University Art Gallery are among the institutions holding works by Moses Soyer. The untitled painting in the collection of the Honolulu Museum of Art is an example of his intimate and psychologically penetrating portraits of ordinary people, for which he is best known.

References

Further reading

External links
Moses Soyer Biography by American Contemporary Art Galleries
 
 
Several Soyer exhibition catalogs from The Metropolitan Museum of Art Libraries (fully available online as PDF)

Emigrants from the Russian Empire to the United States
Jews from the Russian Empire
Jewish American artists
Jewish painters
Social realist artists
American people of Russian-Jewish descent
1899 births
1974 deaths
Federal Art Project artists
20th-century American painters
American male painters
Cooper Union alumni